The Magic:  The Gathering Pro Tour Hall of Fame was started in 2005 to honor the most successful Magic: The Gathering Pro Tour players. The first inductions came on the tenth anniversary of the first Pro Tour event, and new Hall of Famers will be determined annually. Players who are eligible for the ballot (as below) can be voted in the Hall of Fame if they get more than 60% of the election committee's votes. As of 2018, there are 48 players from 12 countries in the Hall of Fame.

Eligibility
In order to appear on the Hall of Fame selection ballot, a player must meet the following five requirements (or the first four requirements if they never appeared in any previous ballots):
 The player must have participated in their first Magic: the Gathering Pro Tour at least 10 seasons prior to the current voting year.
 The player must have at least 150 lifetime Pro Tour Points. (Prior to 2013, the threshold was 100 lifetime Pro Tour Points.)
 The player must have at least 2 single-elimination round finishes in Pro Tours. (From 2017 onwards)
 The player must not currently be suspended from playing Magic or be under investigation by the DCI (Previous suspension does not disqualify a player from entering the Hall of Fame.)
 The player must not currently be removed from ballot by the voting committee. If they are currently removed by the ballot, they must finish with at least 4 Pro Points in period between the previous and current voting.

(* Pro Tour includes all Magic: The Gathering World Championship before year 2011)

Voting process
The Selection Committee votes on whom to induct into the Hall of Fame. The committee includes Wizards of the Coast employees, DCI members, judges, long-time reporters, developers, all Hall of Famers, and every Magic player with at least 150 Pro Points. Every member of the Selection Committee gets to vote for up to five of the eligible players. Afterwards every player with at least 60% of the votes gets inducted into the Hall of Fame. If nobody gets 60% of the vote, the player with the most votes will be inducted into the Hall of Fame.

If a player received 10% or less of the votes in 3 consecutive votings, they will be removed from the Hall of Fame ballot. They will be eligible again if they score 4 Pro Tour Points during a specific period (roughly the same period between two consecutive votings).

Historical selection process
The selection procedure was changed several times. In 2005 the Selection Committee voted for five players, and the four players receiving the most votes were inducted. Then a Players' Committee voted for one player that was not already selected, and the player receiving the most votes was also inducted.

From 2006 members of the Selection Committee and the Players' Committee received the list of players eligible for induction. Each member selected five players for induction. The votes were tabulated by a weighted percentage:  Selection Committee votes counted 2/3, and Players' Committee votes counted 1/3. In 2006 and 2007 the five players with the highest percentages were inducted into the Hall of Fame. Between 2008 and 2016 only the players with over 40% of the weighted votes were inducted or if no one meets this criterion the player with the highest percentage was inducted.

Benefits
The Hall of Fame inductees will receive a number of benefits for the rest of their life (unless suspended by the DCI). As of 2016–17 season, it includes the benefits below:
A guaranteed entry to any Pro Tour event and World Magic Cup Qualifiers
Appearance fee at the Pro Tour featuring the yearly Hall of Fame induction.
Bye(s) in Grand Prix and World Magic Cup Qualifiers.
Additional Magic Online Championship Series seasonal QPs.
If a Hall of Fame player is a current Platinum level member of the Pro Players Club, the higher reward will apply to them (i.e. they receive two instead of one bye in World Magic Cup Qualifiers, 20QP instead of 15QP in the Magic Online Championship Series).

Players who enter the Hall of Fame since will also receive a special commemorative ring at the induction ceremony.

Inductees

Controversies

Tomoharu Saito banning
In the ballot of 2010, Tomoharu Saito was voted into the Hall of Fame with a weighted percentage of 47.74%. However, two weeks prior to the induction Saito was disqualified during Grand Prix Florence leading to an 18-month suspension from the game. The rules do not allow currently-suspended players to be voted into the Hall of Fame. Wizards announced without further explanation that Saito would not be part of the Hall of Fame based on the 2010 ballot.

Bram Snepvangers miscalculation
In the original ballot results for 2010, Bram Snepvangers received a weighted percentage of 39.95%, barely missing the required 40%. However, in the days following the publication of results it was discovered that there had been an error in the calculations. Weights of 0.667 and 0.333 had been used for the votes from the Selection Committee and Players Committee respectively while the rules clearly stated that 0.67 and 0.33 were the correct numbers. After recalculating the scores Snepvangers landed at 40.03% and was inducted into the Hall of Fame along with Nassif and Kibler.

Yuuya Watanabe removal
In April 2019, during a deck check at Mythic Championship II in London it was found that some of Watanabe's card sleeves had been marked in a distinct way. This led to his disqualification from the tournament. On May 9, 2019, Wizards of the Coast announced that Watanabe would be removed from the Hall of Fame for cheating, as well as receiving a 30-month ban from sanctioned events and being removed from the Magic Pro League. This event made Watanabe the first and so far only player to ever be removed from the Hall of Fame.

Inductees by country

Notes

References

External links
 Hall of Fame webpage
 Eligibility through 2020

Magic: The Gathering
Game awards
Entertainment halls of fame
Awards established in 2005
Halls of fame in Washington (state)